Jan Goedhart (28 June 1893 – 16 September 1975) was a Dutch painter. His work was part of the art competitions at the 1936 Summer Olympics and the 1948 Summer Olympics. Goedhart's work was included in the 1939 exhibition and sale Onze Kunst van Heden (Our Art of Today) at the Rijksmuseum in Amsterdam.

References

1893 births
1975 deaths
20th-century Dutch painters
Dutch male painters
Olympic competitors in art competitions
20th-century Dutch male artists
Dutch people of the Dutch East Indies